The senatorial districts of the Philippines were the representations of the provinces of the Philippines in the Philippine Senate from 1916 to 1935.

History 

The enactment of the Philippine Autonomy Act (popularly known as "Jones Law") in August 1916 by the United States Congress provided for the creation of a bicameral legislature consisting of a lower chamber (House of Representatives) and an upper chamber (Senate). Until then the Philippine Commission held the executive power and some legislative powers over the American colony.

The system of government of the Philippines in its early years of transition to democratic self-government was deliberately structured to emulate the American model. The Philippines thus followed the American system of electing the members of the 24-seat senate by district.

The districts were organized and numbered in a roughly north–south fashion, much like the present administrative regions. The first eleven districts were composed of established provinces, while the twelfth was composed of the provinces of the Luzon interior and much of Mindanao – both of which were never fully administered by the old Spanish colonial government and designated by American authorities as "Non-Christian" areas.

The first to eleventh districts elected two senators each by popular vote. The two senators from the twelfth district were appointed by the U.S. Governor-General. The setup lasted until the establishment of the Commonwealth of the Philippines in 1935, when the bicameral legislature was abolished, as the 1935 Constitution provided only for a unicameral National Assembly. However, when the Constitution was amended in 1940 to re-establish a bicameral Congress, members of the Senate had to be voted at-large, thereby effectively abolishing the district system.

List

See also 
 Congressional districts of the Philippines
 Lists of electoral districts by nation

References

External links 
List of senators – Senate of the Philippines

 
Senate
History of the Congress of the Philippines
Philippines